Hyyrynen is a Finnish surname. Notable people with the surname include:

Mikko Hyyrynen (born 1977), Finnish footballer
Tuija Hyyrynen (born 1988), Finnish footballer

Finnish-language surnames
Surnames of Finnish origin